The history of the Jews in Latin America began with seven sailors arriving in Christopher Columbus's crew. Since then, the Jewish population of Latin America has risen to more than 500,000 — most of whom live in Argentina, with large communities also present in Brazil. The following is a list of some prominent Argentine Jews:

Athletes

 Daniel Brailovsky, football player
 Carolina Duer, boxer
 Gastón Etlis, tennis player
 Nicolas Falczuk, football player 
 Fernando Fligman, football player
 Naón Isidro, football player
 Martín Jaite, tennis player
 Waldo Kantor, volleyball player
 Giselle Kañevsky, field hockey player
 Valentina Kogan, handball player
 Nora Koppel, weightlifter
 Daniela Krukower, judoka
 Lucas Matías Licht, football player
 Bryan Man, football player 
 Federico Mociulsky, football player
 José Pekerman, football coach
 Sergio Roitman, tennis player
 Martín Schusterman, rugby player
 Diego Schwartzman, tennis player 
 Juan Pablo Sorín, football player
 Eial Strahman, football player 
 Ezra Sued, football player
 Pablo Tabachnik, table tennis player
 Nicolás Tauber, football player
 Jonathan Tennenbaum, football player 
 Nicolas Valansi, football player 
 Alexis Weisheim, football player
 Fernando Zylberberg, field hockey player

Entertainers
 Héctor Babenco, film director
 Tato Bores, humorist
 Daniel Burman, filmmaker
 Julio Chávez, actor
 Jorge Guinzburg, journalist, theatrical producer, humorist and TV and radio host
 Gerardo Sofovich, TV producer, humorist
 Hugo Sofovich, TV producer and humorist
 Max Berliner, Polish-Argentine actor, author, film director and theater director
 Norman Briski, well known theater actor, director and playwright

Musicians
 Martha Argerich, concert pianist
 Daniel Barenboim, conductor and pianist
 Mario Davidovsky, composer
 Giora Feidman, klezmer musician
 Max Glücksmann, pioneer of the Argentine music and film industries
 Osvaldo Golijov, classical composer
 Alejandro Lerner, singer-songwriter
 Lalo Schifrin, composer
 Oscar Strasnoy, composer and conductor
 Andrés Calamaro, singer-songwriter

Politicians
 José Alperovich, former governor of Tucumán Province
 Tania Bíder, revolutionary fighter
 Myriam Bregman, congresswoman
 Beatriz Rojkés de Alperovich, former provisional president of the Senate
 Daniel Filmus, government minister and former senator
 Itai Hagman, student leader and congressman
 Carlos Heller, banker and congressman
 César Jaroslavsky, former national congressman
 Axel Kicillof, governor of Buenos Aires Province
 Héctor Timerman, journalist, human rights activist and diplomat, former foreign minister
 Hugo Yasky, trade unionist and congressman

Religion
 Sergio Bergman, rabbi, politician, pharmacist, writer and social activist
 Abraham Skorka, rabbi and biophysicist
 Isaac Sacca, rabbi

Scientists
 Laszlo Biro, inventor of the ballpoint pen
 César Milstein, immunologist, Nobel Prize in Medicine winner

Mathematicians
 Gregory Chaitin, mathematician
 Beppo Levi, mathematician
 Cora Sadosky, mathematician
 Manuel Sadosky, mathematician

Writers
 Marcos Aguinis, journalist, writer
 Marcelo Birmajer, writer
 Isidoro Blaisten, writer
 Sergio Chejfec, writer
 León Dujovne, writer, philosopher, journalist, essayist
 Samuel Eichelbaum, writer
 Juan Gelman, poet
 Alberto Gerchunoff, writer
 Noé Jitrik, essayist, literary critic
 Alberto Manguel, novelist and essayist
 Alejandra Pizarnik, poet
 Andrés Rivera, born Marcos Ribak, novelist
 Alejandro Rozitchner, essayist
 Ana María Shua, writer
 César Tiempo, born Israel Zeitlin, writer and screenwriter
 Jacobo Timerman, political commentator, journalist 
 Bernardo Verbitsky, novelist
 Horacio Verbitsky, journalist
 Federico Andahazi, writer

Others
 Mario Blejer, economist
 Miguel Najdorf, Polish-Argentine chess grandmaster
 Raquel Partnoy, painter
 Naomi Preizler, fashion model and artist
 Natalio Alberto Nisman, a lawyer who worked as a federal prosecutor, noted for being the chief investigator of the 1994 car bombing of the Jewish center in Buenos Aires, which killed 85 people, the worst terrorist attack in Argentina's history
 Alejandro Romay, businessman 
 Damián Szifron, film and television director and screenwriter

See also
History of the Jews in Argentina
List of Latin American Jews
List of Argentines
List of Jews

Footnotes

+
Jews
Argentine
[[Category:Lists of people by ethnicity|Jews,Argentine]